John George Laughton  (2 December 1891 – 3 July 1965) was a New Zealand Presbyterian missionary. He was born in the parish of Holm in Orkney, Scotland, on 2 December 1891.

In the 1948 King's Birthday Honours, Laughton was appointed a Companion of the Order of St Michael and St George, in recognition of his service as a member of the Māori Mission Department of the Presbyterian Church.

References

1891 births
1965 deaths
Scottish Presbyterian missionaries
New Zealand Presbyterians
Scottish emigrants to New Zealand
Presbyterian missionaries in New Zealand
New Zealand Companions of the Order of St Michael and St George